Geçitli is a village in the central district of Hakkâri Province in Turkey. The village is populated by Kurds of the Gewdan and Pinyanişî tribes and had a population of 1,561 in 2022. Geçitli is the largest village in the central district of Hakkâri Province.

Population 
Population history from 2000 to 2022:

References 

Villages in Hakkâri District
Kurdish settlements in Hakkâri Province